Eric Hansen may refer to:
Eric Hansen (chess player) (born 1992), Canadian-American chess player
Eric Hansen (drummer), American drummer
Eric Hansen (sportswriter), American sportswriter
Eric Hansen (travel writer), American author
Eric Hansen (wrestler) (1934–1978), Danish wrestler
Eric T. Hansen (born 1960), American writer in Germany
Eric Hansen (character), from Malcolm in the Middle

See also
Erik Hansen (disambiguation)
Erik Hanson (disambiguation)